Nishada sambara is a moth of the family Erebidae first described by Frederic Moore in 1859. It is found on Sumatra, Borneo, Java, the Sangihe Islands, Bali and the Philippines. The habitat consists of lowland forests.

References

Lithosiina
Moths described in 1859